The 2005 Istanbul Park GP2 Series round was a GP2 Series motor race held on August 20 and 21, 2005 at Istanbul Park in Istanbul, Turkey. It was the ninth round of the 2005 GP2 Series season. The race weekend supported the 2005 Turkish Grand Prix.

Classification

Qualifying

Feature race

Sprint race

References

External links
 Motorsportstats

Istanbul Park
GP2
Auto races in Turkey
August 2005 sports events in Turkey